"Staying Power" is a song by Queen.

Staying Power may also refer to:

Staying Power (album), Barry White's double-Grammy-Award 1999 album
"Staying Power" (Barry White song)
Stayin' Power, a 1981 single of Neil Young
Staying Power, a 2006 album by the Hollies
Staying Power, a 1999 crime novel by Judith Cutler
Staying Power: The History of Black People in Britain (1984), book by Peter Fryer